The 1873 Athletic Baseball Club of Philadelphia finished in fifth place in the National Association with a record of 28-23. First baseman Cap Anson batted .398 and was second in the league batting race.

Regular season

Season standings

Record vs. opponents

Roster

Player stats

Batting

Starters by position
Note: Pos = Position; G = Games played; AB = At bats; H = Hits; Avg. = Batting average; HR = Home runs; RBI = Runs batted in

Other batters
Note: G = Games played; AB = At bats; H = Hits; Avg. = Batting average; HR = Home runs; RBI = Runs batted in

Pitching

Starting pitchers
Note: G = Games pitched; IP = Innings pitched; W = Wins; L = Losses; ERA = Earned run average; SO = Strikeouts

Relief pitchers
Note: G = Games pitched; IP = Innings pitched; W = Wins; L = Losses; ERA = Earned run average; SO = Strikeouts

References
1873 Philadelphia Athletics season at Baseball Reference

Philadelphia Athletics (1860–1876) seasons
Philadelphia Athletics Season, 1873